Morgan Township is one of twelve townships in Coles County, Illinois, USA.  As of the 2010 census, its population was 359 and it contained 163 housing units.

Geography

Unincorporated towns
 Bushton
 Rardin

Cemeteries
The township contains five cemeteries: Craig, Hoagland (historical), Knoch, Union and Winkleblack.

Demographics

School districts
 Arcola Consolidated Unit School District 306
 Charleston Community Unit School District 1
 Oakland Community Unit School District 5

Political districts
 Illinois' 15th congressional district
 State House District 110
 State Senate District 55

References
 
 United States Census Bureau 2007 TIGER/Line Shapefiles
 United States National Atlas

External links
 City-Data.com
 Illinois State Archives

Adjacent townships 

Townships in Coles County, Illinois
Townships in Illinois